Rhodes Preparatory School (1911–1987) was a private school New York City, United States and initially located at 8-10-12-14 W 125th Street, Manhattan, New York City, United States, and  located for much of its history at 11 West 54th Street.  The school was named for John Cecil Rhodes.   It included a lower school with students in seventh and eighth grades and an upper school for students from grades nine through twelve. For a brief period, it also had fifth and sixth grade classes. There was also an evening school for adults.

Rhodes was a college preparatory school. It attracted students from all over the world. Many graduates went on to Ivy League or Seven Sisters schools, and to other prestigious institutions around the country and the world. The now-defunct school is often referred to as "Rhodes School" or simply "Rhodes".

Signs in the classrooms read, "Every class is an English class."

The Warwick New York Hotel, located just a few doors down at 65 West 54th Street, hosted many school functions in its ballroom. Several Rhodes proms and commencement ceremonies were held at another New York hotel, the Waldorf Astoria.

Rhodes was the model for the school in the novel Catcher in the Rye by J.D. Salinger, the school of last resort for ne'er-do-wells who were kicked out of other private schools; e.g. Rick Jason (actor: Combat), who had been kicked out of nine other preparatory schools for outlandish behavior.

Timeline
1911 - Leo Freedman, B.S. B.Ed. (Columbia University) founds the school and is the first president
1924? - 1933  – bankers David Merrall was President of the school 
By 1927, Leo Freedman has left the school and has founded the Beverly School for Boys in Los Angeles, CA.
1933-1966 J. Leslie White was President of the school

1938 – Relocates to 1041 6th Avenue (40th Street)
1945 – Relocates to 11 West 54th Street (5th – 6th Aves)
1959 – Dr. Robert Lowrance becomes headmaster, and William Kien becomes Director of Admissions
1974 – David Merrall dies; Seymour Merrall, his son, takes ownership
1979 – Relocates to Holy Trinity Roman Catholic School on West 83rd Street; US Trust Company buys West 54th Street building
1980 – Seymour Merrall sells Rhodes to Donald Nickerson, headmaster of La Jolla Country Day School (California)
1981 – 11 West 54th Street building is designated a New York City landmark
August 1985 – Dr. Robert Lowrance dies
1987 – Rhodes becomes part of La Jolla Country Day School
1992 – Relocates to the Anglo-American School at 291 Central Park West (89th St.) which then becomes part of the Dwight School
July 21, 2001 – First Rhodes reunion, at TGI Friday's in Rockefeller Center
July 26, 2003 – Second Rhodes reunion, at the Park Avenue Country Club (27th St. and Park Ave.)

Former students
Alice Barrett-Mitchell (actress, TV's Another World)
Ron Brown (former U.S. Commerce Secretary)
James Caan (actor, The Godfather)
Robert De Niro (actor, Taxi Driver)
Thomas Glave (writer, academic, activist)
Juan Pan Guerrero (Northern Mariana Islands politician)
Stephen Adly Guirgis (playwright and actor)
Rick Jason (actor, TV's Combat!)
Mark Kellner (technology journalist, Adventist Review News Editor)
Denise Nickerson (actress, TV's Dark Shadows, Willy Wonka & the Chocolate Factory)
Kay Mazzo (ballet dancer and educator)
Jane Olivor (singer)
Ana Ortiz (actress, TV's Ugly Betty)
Marc Rich (financier)
Jane Stern (writer)

References
 Rhodes School history

External links
 Rhodes alumni newsletter
 U.S. Trust Company building
 Rhodes School memories
 Rhodes Preparatory School alumni

Defunct schools in New York City
Defunct high schools in Manhattan
Private high schools in Manhattan
Private middle schools in Manhattan